Jaise Ko Taisa is a 1973 Indian Hindi-language comedy film, produced by M. Saravanan and M. Balasubramaniam under the AVM Productions banner and directed by Murugan Kumaran. It stars Jeetendra, Reena Roy  and music composed by R. D. Burman. The film is a remake of 1970 Kannada film Bhale Jodi.

Plot
Look-alike twins are separated at birth. One grows up as a farmer in tough surroundings, and hard work; while the other grows up with a wealthy family. The one with the wealthy family is abused, beaten, drugged, and tormented in order to keep him subdued and controlled by the rest of the family and certain employees, so that they can continue to live an easy life, at his cost. Things change dramatically, when the twins are switched, with the hardworking one ending up with the wealthy family, and the other ending up with his mother and a hard life.

Cast
Jeetendra as Vijay / Vinod (Double Role)
Reena Roy as Roopa
Srividya as Radha
Kamini Kaushal as Vijay's Mother
Anwar Hussain as Shyamlal "Mamaji"
Ramesh Deo as Prakashchand "Pashi"
Mohan Choti as Gopal (Clerk)
Dinesh Hingoo as Bhim (Cook)
Rojaramani as Munni

Soundtrack
All songs were penned by Anand Bakshi.

References

External links
 

1973 films
1970s Hindi-language films
1973 drama films
Twins in Indian films
Films scored by R. D. Burman
Hindi remakes of Kannada films